Tunisia's A1 or A-1 motorway is a 247 km road connecting Tunis and Sfax. In the map shown, the A-1 is in red. The highway was built from Tunis at the north end toward the south and is continuing to be extended.

The A-1 is conceived of as part of an international project, sometimes called the Trans-Maghreb or Trans-North Africa Highway or Trans-African Highway 1 that is planned to reach from Cairo to Dakar.

There are three lanes each way from Tunis to Hammamet then two lanes each way from Hammamet to Sfax. It is a toll road part of the way.  Road signs are in Arabic and French. The speed limit on Tunisian highways is 110 km/h.

History 
The first section connected Tunis to Turki (near Grombalia) in 1981. It was extended to Hammamet in 1986, to Enfidha in 1994, and to Sfax in 2008 and to Gabes in 2019.

Further construction 
The extension to Gabes took a long time: pogress slowed after the Tunisian revolution of 2011 and the European Investment Bank provided some financing for extensions, starting in 2014. 

In January 2023, advancement of the remaining 182 km from Gabès to Medenine, Ben Gardane, and to Ras Jedir on the Libyan border was estimated to be 90% completed at cost of  550 million dinars, with already 5 interchanges, 4 toll stations, 4 restop areas, and 107 hydraulic structures already built on the Gabes-Medenine section. Opening is planned for the end of May 2023.

Distances, rest areas, and exits 

The planned route from Tunis to the Libyan frontier is 573 km:
 Tunis-Hammamet (51 km)
 Hammamet-M'saken (92 km) with an exit at Sousse
 M'saken-Sfax (97 km) with an exit at Mahdia
 Sfax-Gabès (151 km, under development)
 Gabès-Libyan border (182 km, planned for 2018)

There are service areas at Grombalia, Sidi Khelifa, Borjine, and El Jem.

Exits and interchanges are, in order: the interchange between A1 and Olympic City November 7th, Hammam Lif, Mornag, Grombalia, Turki, Hammamet-Nord, Golf Hammamet, Hammamet, Hammamet-Sud, Bouficha, Enfidha, Enfidha–Hammamet International Airport, Hergla, Sidi Bou Ali, Kalâa Kebira, Sousse, Sousse city center, M'saken, Jemmel, Kerker, El Jem, El Hencha, and Sfax-Nord

References

Gallery

External links 
 Wikivoyage:Tunisia discusses travel on Tunisian highways

Motorways in Tunisia